Glycomyces sediminimaris is a bacterium from the genus of Glycomyces which has been isolated from marine sediments from Bushehr in Iran.

References 

Actinomycetia
Bacteria described in 2018